Kartmazovo is a rural locality (a (selo)  in Moskovsky Settlement of Moscow, Russia. Population:

References

Moskovsky Settlement
Rural localities in Moscow (federal city)